In mathematics, influence function is used to mean either:
 a synonym for a Green's function;
 Influence function (statistics), the effect on an estimator of changing one point of the sample